HMS S1 was a British submarine built in 1914 based on an Italian design.

While on patrol in June 1915 the submarine's engines failed. The crew were able to capture the German fishing trawler Ost and used it to tow the submarine home.

The submarine was transferred to the Italian Royal Navy in October 1915.

Bibliography

References

External links
 S 1 Marina Militare website 

 

British S-class submarines (1914)
1914 ships
World War I submarines of the United Kingdom
British S-class submarines (1914) of the Regia Marina
World War I submarines of Italy
Ships built on the River Clyde